Self-Portrait in Black and White: Unlearning Race is a 2019 book by Thomas Chatterton Williams. It was published by W. W. Norton & Company on October 15, 2019.

Thesis
Thomas, the son of a black father and a white mother, who grew up identifying as black, explains in the book how he has come to unlearn his racial identity.

Publication and promotion
The book was published by W. W. Norton & Company on October 15, 2019. Williams appeared on Real Time with Bill Maher on October 18, 2019 to promote the book.

Reception
Andrew Solomon praised the book in The New York Times, writing "… he is so honest and fresh in his observations, so skillful at blending his own story with larger principles, that it is hard not to admire him. At a time of increasing division, his philosophizing evinces an underlying generosity. He reaches both ways across the aisle of racism, arguing above all for reciprocity, and in doing so begins to theorize the temperate peace of which all humanity is sorely in need."

At the review aggregator website Book Marks, which assigns individual ratings to book reviews from mainstream literary critics, the book received a cumulative "Mixed" rating based on 12 reviews: 2 "Rave" reviews, 3 "Positive" reviews, 4 "Mixed" reviews, and 3 "Pan" reviews.

References

External links
After Words interview with Williams on Self-Portrait in Black and White, December 28, 2019

2019 non-fiction books
Books about race and ethnicity
African-American autobiographies
Books critical of modern liberalism in the United States
W. W. Norton & Company books